Kenneth “Ken” Harnden (born 31 March 1973 in Salisbury – now Harare) is a Zimbabwean track and field coach and former hurdler who specialized in the 400 metres hurdles.

His personal best time is 48.05 seconds, achieved in July 1998 in Paris. Together with Tawanda Chiwira, Phillip Mukomana and Savieri Ngidhi he holds the Zimbabwean record in 4 x 400 metres relay with 3:00.79 minutes, achieved during the heats at the 1997 World Championships in Athens. Harnden also competed for Zimbabwe in both the 1996 and 2000 Summer Olympics. 

 Under his tutelage, sophomore Walter Dix won the NCAA indoor and outdoor 200m National Championships, became a five-time All-American, a two-time NCAA East Region title holder in the 100m and 200m, six-time individual ACC Championship winner, and holds six All-ACC accolades in addition to shattering numerous school, league and world records. Fellow rookie sprinter Ricardo Chambers broke Harnden's longstanding Mike Long Track Record in the 400m while his 4x100m relay earned All-American honors for the second consecutive season. Zimbabwean 200m sprint record holder and All Africa games medalist Brian Dzingai. In his first two seasons, his 400m relay squads have finished in the top three on FSU's all-time list. www.seminoles.com

Competition record

External links
 

1973 births
Living people
Alumni of Peterhouse Boys' School
Zimbabwean people of British descent
White Zimbabwean sportspeople
Zimbabwean male hurdlers
Athletes (track and field) at the 1994 Commonwealth Games
Athletes (track and field) at the 1996 Summer Olympics
Athletes (track and field) at the 1998 Commonwealth Games
Athletes (track and field) at the 2000 Summer Olympics
Olympic athletes of Zimbabwe
Sportspeople from Harare
Commonwealth Games bronze medallists for Zimbabwe
Commonwealth Games medallists in athletics
World Athletics Championships athletes for Zimbabwe
African Games silver medalists for Zimbabwe
African Games medalists in athletics (track and field)
Athletes (track and field) at the 1999 All-Africa Games
Medallists at the 1998 Commonwealth Games